St John's is a proposed £1 bn development of a 6 hectare plot within central Manchester, England. The site is being developed by Manchester Quays Ltd (MQL), a partnership between Manchester City Council and Allied London.

Development 

The development will see up to 2,500 homes, up to 600,000 sq ft of workspace, mostly aimed at creative industries, (80,000 sq ft of this via refurbishment of the Bonded Warehouse), up to 400,000 sq ft of leisure space, incorporating some of the existing entertainment and studio buildings. The development will be on the former site of Granada Studios but it will extend as far as the Museum of Science and Industry and the Marriott Hotel on Water Street.

SimpsonHaugh and Partners are behind the masterplan which will also see two fifty storey towers and three hotels, including the Granada Hotel incorporating the iconic red neon 'Granada TV' sign.

Factory International

The development will feature a new £110 million theatre and arts venue called Factory International. Its name comes from Factory Records, the independent record label founded by the late Tony Wilson. The flexible space will provide a permanent home to the Manchester International Festival.

The £9.5m design contracts were put out to tender in July 2015. The successful company named by the council in November 2015 was the Office for Metropolitan Architecture (OMA) with its lead designer Rem Koolhaas.

The opening ceremony was planned for the end of 2019, though it is now expected in June 2023.

References

External links 
 Development's website
 Manchester City Council's Regeneration Team

Areas of Manchester
Planned developments